Viktor Gurjev (29 August 1914 Riga – 11 October 1985 Tallinn) was an Estonian opera singer (tenor) and pedagogue.

In 1951 he graduated from Tallinn State Conservatory in singing speciality. 1937-1940 he was a member of Vassili Kirillov mandolin ensemble. 1942-1944 he belonged to Estonian SSR State Artistic Ensembles. 1944-1950 he sang with the Estonian National Male Choir. 1949–1968 he was a soloist at Estonia Theatre. From  1956 until 1963, he taught at the Tallinn Music School.

From 1970 until 1982, he was the rector of Tallinn State Conservatory.

Awards
 1954: Estonian SSR merited artist 
 1960: Estonian SSR people's artist

Opera roles

 duke (Dargomõžski's "Näkineid", 1949)
 Alfredo (Verdi's "Traviata", 1950 and 1962)
 Lenski (Tšaikovski's "Jevgeni Onegin", 1950 and 1966)

References

1914 births
1985 deaths
20th-century Estonian male opera singers
Estonian Academy of Music and Theatre alumni
Academic staff of the Estonian Academy of Music and Theatre
Rectors of universities in Estonia
People from Riga
Estonian people of Russian descent
Burials at Metsakalmistu
Soviet opera singers